"A Brand New Day" is a song by J-Hope and V of South Korean boy band BTS and Swedish singer Zara Larsson, released on June 14, 2019, as the second single from the BTS World: Original Soundtrack. It was produced by Mura Masa.

Background
"A Brand New Day" has been described as an "electronic hip-hop song", with instrumentation featuring a prominent daegeum, a Korean bamboo flute, and producer Mura Masa providing an accompanying beat.

Track listing

Charts

Release history

References

2019 singles
2019 songs
BTS songs
Zara Larsson songs
Macaronic songs
Male–female vocal duets
Songs written by Zara Larsson
Songs written by J-Hope
Hybe Corporation singles
Songs written by Mura Masa